Graceland is the seventh solo studio album by the American singer-songwriter Paul Simon. It was produced by Simon, engineered by Roy Halee and released on August 25, 1986, by Warner Bros. Records.

In the early 1980s, Simon's relationship with his former musical partner Art Garfunkel had deteriorated, his marriage to the actress Carrie Fisher had collapsed, and his previous record, Hearts and Bones (1983), had been a commercial failure. In 1984, after a period of depression, Simon became fascinated by a bootleg cassette of mbaqanga, South African street music. He and Halee visited Johannesburg, where they spent two weeks recording with South African musicians. Further recordings were held in the United States, with guest musicians including Linda Ronstadt, the Everly Brothers, Louisiana band Good Rockin' Dopsie and the Twisters, and Los Angeles band Los Lobos.

Graceland features an eclectic mixture of genres, including pop, rock, a cappella, zydeco, isicathamiya and mbaqanga. Simon wrote songs inspired by the recordings made in Johannesburg, collaborating with African and American artists. He received criticism for breaking the cultural boycott of South Africa because of its policy of apartheid. Following its completion, Simon toured alongside South African musicians, performing their music and songs from Graceland.

Graceland became Simon's most successful studio album and his highest-charting album in over a decade; it is estimated to have sold more than 16 million copies worldwide. It was lauded by critics, won the 1987 Grammy for Album of the Year, and is frequently cited as one of the best albums of all time. In 2006, it was added to the United States' National Recording Registry as "culturally, historically, or aesthetically important".

Background

Following a series of hit records released in the 1970s, Simon's career declined. His relationship with his former musical partner Art Garfunkel had again deteriorated; his sixth solo studio album, Hearts and Bones (1983), achieved the lowest sales of his career; and his marriage to the actress Carrie Fisher collapsed. "I had a personal blow, a career setback, and the combination of the two put me into a tailspin", he recalled.

In 1984, Simon agreed to produce a record by a young singer-songwriter, Heidi Berg. Berg had played in the house bands for Saturday Night Live and The New Show and was introduced to Simon by the television producer Lorne Michaels. As an example of how she wanted her record to sound, Heidi loaned Simon a bootlegged tape of mbaqanga, black street music from the Soweto township of Johannesburg. Simon described it as "very good summer music, happy music" that reminded him of 1950s rhythm and blues. He began improvising melodies over it as he listened in his car.

Simon asked his contacts at his label, Warner, to identify the artists on the tape. Through the South African record producer Hilton Rosenthal, Warner confirmed that the music was South African and played by either the vocal group Ladysmith Black Mambazo or the Boyoyo Boys. Simon considered buying the rights to his favorite song on the tape, "Gumboots", and using it to write his own song, as he had with the song "El Condor Pasa" in the 1960s. Instead, Rosenthal suggested that Simon record an album of South African music, and sent him dozens of records from South African artists.

In the 1980s, recording in South Africa was dangerous, and the United Nations had imposed a cultural boycott for its policy of apartheid. This forced states to "prevent all cultural, academic, sporting and other exchanges" with South Africa, and ordered writers, artists, musicians and "other personalities" to boycott it. Nonetheless, Simon resolved to go to South Africa, and told The New York Times: "I knew I would be criticized if I went, even though I wasn't going to record for the government ... or to perform for segregated audiences. I was following my musical instincts in wanting to work with people whose music I greatly admired."

Before leaving for Johannesburg, Simon contributed to "We Are the World", a charity single benefiting African famine relief. Simon discussed recording in South Africa with the "We Are the World" producers Quincy Jones and Harry Belafonte, who both encouraged him to go. The South African black musicians' union also voted to let Simon come, as it could benefit their music by placing it on an international stage. When Simon told Berg of his plans to record an album inspired by the tape she had loaned him, their working relationship deteriorated.

Recording

In February 1985, Simon and his longtime engineer Roy Halee flew to Johannesburg, intending their visit to be secret. The Warner executives were uninterested in the project, viewing Simon as a bad investment due to the failure of his previous two solo albums. Simon felt their indifference worked in his favor, as it gave him more freedom. Halee believed executives at the label viewed him and Simon as "crazy".

Rosenthal used his connections to assemble musicians who had inspired Simon, including Lulu Masilela, Tao Ea Matsekha, General M. D. Shirinda and the Gaza Sisters and the Boyoyo Boys Band. Though musicians in Johannesburg were typically paid $15 an hour, Simon arranged to pay them $200 an hour, around triple the rate for top players in New York City. Simon said he "wanted to be as above board as I could possibly be", as many of the musicians did not know who he was and would not be lured by the promise of royalties alone. He also offered writer's royalties to those he felt had actually contributed to composing the songs.

Recording sessions took place at Ovation Studios. Halee worried the studio would be a "horror show" but was surprised to find it "very comfortable". It was reminiscent of a garage, which Halee feared would be a problem for recording, and none of the musicians wore headphones. Jam sessions ranged from 10 to 30 minutes, and Simon and Halee intended to assemble an album from the recordings on their return home. Though the playing was technically simple, Simon found it difficult to mimic. Outside the studio, the public was hostile toward Simon, but the Musician's Union received him warmly.

Though Simon described the recording sessions as "euphoric", he recalled "tension below the surface" due to the effects of apartheid. The musicians would become anxious when recording continued into the evening, since they were prohibited from using public transportation or being on the streets after curfew. Simon recalled, "In the middle of the euphoric feeling in the studio, you would have reminders that you're living in an incredibly tense racial environment, where the law of the land was apartheid." 

At the end of the two-week trip, Simon felt a relief from his personal turmoil and a revitalized passion for music. He and Halee returned to the Hit Factory studio in New York City to edit the material. Simon flew several South African musicians to New York to complete the record three months after the Johannesburg sessions. The sessions resulted in "You Can Call Me Al" and "Under African Skies". Simon began writing lyrics at his home in Montauk, New York, while listening to the recordings. The process was slow, but he determined he had sufficient material to begin rerecording the tracks. He played the tracks backward to "enhance their sound", interspersing gibberish to complete the rhythms.

Simon involved guest musicians, including the American singer Linda Ronstadt and his childhood heroes the Everly Brothers. During a trip to Louisiana with Richard "Dickie" Landry, he saw a performance by the Lafayette zydeco band Good Rockin' Dopsie and the Twisters, and recorded "That Was Your Mother" with them in a small studio behind a music store. He felt that the accordion, central to zydeco, would make a pleasing transition back to his own culture. Afterward, he contacted Mexican-American band Los Lobos, with which he recorded "All Around the World or The Myth of Fingerprints" in Los Angeles.

Halee edited the album with new digital technology, transferring analog tape recordings to the digital workspace countless times. He said: "The amount of editing that went into that album was unbelievable ... without the facility to edit digital, I don't think we could have done that project." He used tape echo and delay on every song, and paid particular attention to the bass, saying: "The bassline is what the album is all about. It's the essence of everything that happened." Each song was mixed in about two days at the Hit Factory, where most of the vocal overdubs were recorded.

Music

Graceland features an eclectic mixture of musical styles including pop, a cappella, zydeco, isicathamiya, rock, and mbaqanga.  Mbaqanga, or "township jive", originated as the street music of Soweto, South Africa. The album was strongly influenced by the earlier work of South African musicians Johnny Clegg and Sipho Mchunu, and their band Juluka's Zulu-Western pop crossover music. Juluka was South Africa's first integrated pop band.  Simon includes thanks to Clegg, Juluka, and Juluka's producer Hilton Rosenthal in the "Special Thanks" citation in Graceland liner notes. He included American "roots" influences with tracks featuring zydeco musicians such as Rockin' Dopsie and Tex-Mex musicians.

The album alternates between playful and more serious songs. Simon thought of it as like a play: "As in a play, the mood should keep changing. A serious song may lead into an abstract song, which may be followed by a humorous song." On many songs, Simon and Halee employ a Synclavier to "enhance" the acoustic instruments, creating an electronic "shadow".

"The Boy in the Bubble" is a collaboration with Lesotho-based Tao Ea Matsekha. "Graceland" features the playing of bassist Bakithi Kumalo and guitarist Ray Phiri. Simon remarks on the album's original liner notes that it reminded him of American country music, and wrote: "After the recording session, Ray told me that he'd used a relative minor chord—something not often heard in South African music—because he said he thought it was more like the chord changes he'd heard in my music." Steel guitarist Demola Adepoju contributed to the track some months after its completion. "I Know What I Know" is based on music from an album by General M.D. Shirinda and the Gaza Sisters. Simon was attracted to their work due to the unusual style of guitar playing, as well as the "distinctive sound" of the women's voices. "Gumboots" is a re-recording (with additional saxophone solos) of the song with which Simon first found himself enamored from the cassette tape that spawned Graceland.

Joseph Shabalala also contributed to "Diamonds on the Soles of Her Shoes", with Ladysmith Black Mambazo and the Senegalese singer-percussionist Youssou N'Dour. It was recorded a week following their appearance on Saturday Night Live. The pennywhistle solo featured on "You Can Call Me Al" was performed by Morris Goldberg, a white South African living in New York. "Homeless" was written jointly by Simon and Shabalala, the lead singer of Ladysmith Black Mambazo, to a melody from a traditional Zulu wedding song. In the song "Under African Skies", "the figure of Joseph becomes the dual image of a dispossessed African black man and the New Testament Joseph." For the song, Simon sent Shabalala a cassette demo, and the two later met at Abbey Road Studios in London, where the rest of the song was completed. "Crazy Love" features music from Stimela, Phiri's group that was very successful in South Africa.

Lyrics
To write lyrics, Simon listened to the recordings made during his time in Johannesburg, identifying patterns in the music to fit to verses. He said:

Simon told The Village Voices Robert Christgau in 1986 that he was bad at writing about politics, and felt his strength was writing about relationships and introspection. In contrast to Hearts and Bones, Graceland subject matter is more upbeat. Simon made an effort to write simply without compromising the language. Composing more personal songs took him significantly longer, as it involved "a lot of avoidance going on". Rewrites were necessary as Simon ended up using overcomplicated words. A perfectionist, Simon rewrote songs only to scrap the newer versions. Songs such as "Graceland" and "The Boy in the Bubble" took three to four months, while others, such as "All Around the World" and "Crazy Love", came together quickly.

"The Boy in the Bubble" discusses starvation and terrorism, but mixes this with wit and optimism. Simon concurred with this assessment: "Hope and dread—that's right. That's the way I see the world, a balance between the two, but coming down on the side of hope." The song retains a variation of the only lyric Simon composed on his South African trip: "The way the camera follows him in slo-mo, the way he smiled at us all." The imagery was inspired by the assassination of John F. Kennedy and the attempted assassination of Ronald Reagan. "Homeless" discusses poverty within the black majority in South Africa. According to Simon's ex-wife Carrie Fisher, the "Graceland" lines "She's come back to tell me she's gone / As if I didn't know that, as if I didn't know my own bed / As if I'd never noticed the way she brushed her hair from her forehead" refer to her. She confirmed she had a habit of brushing her hair from her forehead, and said she felt privileged to be in one of Simon's songs.

Throughout the recording process, Simon remained unsure of the album's thematic connection. He kept dozens of yellow legal pads with random words and phrases he would combine in an attempt to define the album. He derived the album title from the phrase "driving through Wasteland", which he changed to "going to Graceland", a reference to Elvis Presley's Memphis home. Simon believed it represented a spiritual direction: just as he had embarked on a physical journey to collect ideas in Africa, he would spiritually journey to the home of the rock "forefather" to revitalize his love for music.

Release

Graceland was released by Warner Bros. with little promotion in September 1986. Before its release, Simon speculated that he was no longer "a viable commercial force in popular music".

By July 1987, Graceland had sold six million copies worldwide. That year, Rolling Stone David Fricke said the album had become "a daily soundtrack in urban yuppie condos and suburban living rooms and on radio airwaves from Australia to Zimbabwe". In South Africa, it was the best-selling release since Michael Jackson's Thriller (1982). It sold 150,000 copies in Australia in 1988, and had sold 470,000 copies there by January 1989. As of 2014, Graceland was estimated to have sold more than 16 million copies.

The cover art depicts an Ethiopian Christian icon from the collection of the Peabody Essex Museum dating to around 1500.

Critical reception

Initial reviews of Graceland were positive. Rolling Stone Rob Tannenbaum characterized it as "lovely, daring and accomplished". Stephen Holden of The New York Times wrote: "With his characteristic refinement, Mr. Simon has fashioned that event into the rock album equivalent of a work of literature." In The Village Voice, Robert Christgau deemed it Simon's best record since his 1972 self-titled album, as well as "a tremendously engaging and inspired piece of work". It went on to top The Village Voices Pazz & Jop critics' poll for that year (1986).

Retrospective reviews have continued to be positive. According to AllMusic's William Ruhlmann, "Graceland became the standard against which subsequent musical experiments by major artists were measured." Joe Tangari of Pitchfork wrote that "its songs transcend the context as listening experiences. These songs are astute and exciting, spit-shined with the gloss of production that bears a lot of hallmarks of the era but somehow has refused to age. Taken as a whole, the album offers tremendous insight into how we live in our world and how that changes as we get older." Patrick Humphries of BBC Music wrote that "it may well stand as the pinnacle of his remarkable half-century career ... Simon fashioned a record which was truly, blindingly original, and – listening to it a quarter of a century on – modern and timeless." Andy Gill of The Independent wrote: "The character of the base music here is overwhelming: complex, ebullient and life-affirming, and in yoking this intricate dance music to his sophisticated New Yorker sensibility, Simon created a transatlantic bridge that neither pandered to nor patronised either culture."

Accolades
Graceland earned Simon the Best International Solo Artist award at the 1987 Brit Awards. It was ranked No. 84 in a 2005 survey by British television's Channel 4 to determine the 100 greatest albums of all time.

Graceland was ranked 81st on the 2003 list of Rolling Stone magazine's 500 Greatest Albums of All Time, as "an album about isolation and redemption that transcended 'world music' to become the whole world's soundtrack." The ranking increased to 71st in the 2012 revision and 46th in the 2020 list. In 2000 it was voted number 43 in Colin Larkin's All Time Top 1000 Albums. The song "Graceland" was voted #485 in the list of Rolling Stone's 500 Greatest Songs of All Time.

Grammy Awards 

|-
|  style="width:35px; text-align:center;" rowspan="3"|1987|| rowspan="2"|Graceland || Album of the Year || 
|-
|Best Pop Vocal Performance, Male || 
|-
|rowspan="2"|"Graceland"|||Song of the Year || 
|-
| style="text-align:center;"|1988 || Record of the Year  || 
|-

Controversy
Following the album's success, Simon faced accusations by organizations such as Artists United Against Apartheid, anti-apartheid musicians including Billy Bragg, Paul Weller, and Jerry Dammers, and James Victor Gbeho, at the time the Ghanaian Ambassador to the United Nations. Saying Simon had broken the cultural boycott imposed by the rest of the world against the apartheid regime in South Africa, they called him "naive" and condemned him for having potentially damaged anti-apartheid solidarity.

Before going to South Africa, Simon sought advice from Harry Belafonte, with whom he had recently collaborated on "We Are the World". Belafonte had mixed feelings and advised him to discuss the matter with the African National Congress (ANC). At an album launch party, Simon said about the controversy: "I'm with the artists. I didn't ask the permission of the ANC. I didn't ask permission of Buthelezi, or Desmond Tutu, or the Pretoria government. And to tell you the truth, I have a feeling that when there are radical transfers of power on either the left or the right, the artists always get screwed."

James Victor Ghebo, former Ghanaian ambassador to the UN, was critical, saying: "When he goes to South Africa, Paul Simon bows to apartheid. He lives in designated hotels for whites. He spends money the way whites have made it possible to spend money there. The money he spends goes to look after white society, not to the townships." Simon denied that he went to South Africa to "take money out of the country", noting that he paid the black artists handsomely and split royalties with them, and was not paid to play to a white audience. Guitarist Ray Phiri said: "We used Paul as much as Paul used us. There was no abuse. He came at the right time and he was what we needed to bring our music into the mainstream."

Some criticized Simon for not addressing apartheid in his lyrics. Simon responded: "Was I supposed to solve things in a song?" He said he was not good at writing protest songs in the vein of Bob Dylan or Bob Geldof, and felt that although it was not overtly political, Graceland was its own political statement: "I still think it's the most powerful form of politics, more powerful than saying it right on the money, in which case you're usually preaching to the converted. People get attracted to the music, and once they hear what's going on within it, they say, 'What? They're doing that to these people?'"

The United Nations Anti-Apartheid Committee supported Graceland, as it showcased black South African musicians and offered no support to the South African government, but the ANC protested it as a violation of the boycott. The ANC voted to ban Simon from the country, and he was also added to the United Nations blacklist. He was removed from the blacklist in January 1987, and announced that he had been cleared by the ANC, but Artists Against Apartheid founder Dali Tambo denied this. The Graceland concert at London's Royal Albert Hall prompted protests from Dammers, Weller, and Bragg. In 2012, the controversy was revived when Simon returned to London for a 25th-anniversary concert celebrating the album.

In contrast, Simon received praise for encouraging South African music from Hugh Masekela, one of South Africa's most prominent musicians and an exiled opponent of apartheid, who subsequently toured alongside Simon and Miriam Makeba. The album's worldwide success introduced some of the musicians, especially Ladysmith Black Mambazo, to global audiences. South African jazz musician Jonas Gwangwa criticized the notion that Simon was responsible for making South African music popular, asking: "So, it has taken another white man to discover my people?"

Some critics viewed Graceland as colonialist, with Simon appropriating the music of another culture to bring to the global market. Star-Ledger reporter Tris McCall wrote in 2012, "Does it complicate matters to realize that these musicians were second-class citizens in their own country, one groaning under the weight of apartheid? How could Simon approach them as equal partners when their own government demanded that they treat him as a superior?" In 2012, Andrew Mueller of Uncut wrote: "Apartheid was of course a monstrosity, but it would be absurd to suggest that Simon's introduction of South Africa's music to the world prolonged it and quite plausible to suggest that it did some small amount to hasten its undoing."

Linda Ronstadt
Simon's choice to feature the American singer Linda Ronstadt on "Under African Skies" was criticized, as three years earlier she had accepted $500,000 to perform at Sun City, a South African luxury resort. Nelson George of Billboard said her inclusion on Graceland was like "using gasoline to put out birthday candles", and Robert Christgau wrote: "Even if the lyric called for total US divestiture, Ronstadt's presence on Graceland would be a slap in the face to the world anti-apartheid movement."

Simon defended Ronstadt, saying: "I know that her intention was never to support the government there ... She made a mistake. She's extremely liberal in her political thinking and unquestionably antiapartheid." He told Spin he did not think Ronstadt would play at Sun City again, and did not think she was "incompatible" with the record.

Simon had refused to perform on the 1985 antiapartheid single "Sun City", as the demo had included a list of names shaming artists who had performed at the resort, including Ronstadt's, and as he felt Graceland would be "my own statement". He said he had refused two offers to perform at Sun City, and drew a distinction between going to South Africa to perform for a segregated audience, which he felt was unacceptable, and going to record.

Threats against Simon
The cultural boycott against South Africa was lifted in 1991, five years after Graceland's release. At the invitation of anti-apartheid activist Nelson Mandela and with the African National Congress's support, Simon and his band played five shows, beginning at Ellis Park Stadium in Johannesburg. Before the first concert, hand grenades were thrown into the office of promoter Attie van Wyk, who had booked Simon for the shows. A sect of the militant Azanian People's Organisation (AZAPO) claimed responsibility for the attack, which destroyed the office but caused no injuries.

Simon held a clandestine meeting with AZAPO representatives, offering them proceeds from the tour, but no agreement was reached. At a press conference, AZAPO said there was "potential for violence" if the show proceeded. Though hundreds of protesters threatened violence at one concert, it was protected by 800 policemen and proceeded without incident.

According to guitarist Steven Van Zandt, who was involved in the anti-apartheid movement and met with AZAPO representatives, Simon had been "at the top" of AZAPO's assassination list. Van Zandt said he persuaded them that murdering Simon would not help them achieve their goals, and mollified them by saying he was attempting to "unite the music community" against apartheid.

Allegations of plagiarism 
"That Was Your Mother" features the American zydeco band the Good Rockin' Dopsie and the Twisters. Dopsie felt Simon had derived it from his song "My Baby, She's Gone", and was not credited, but decided not to take legal action.

The American group Los Lobos appears on the last track, "All Around the World or the Myth of Fingerprints". Saxophone player Steve Berlin felt they deserved writing credits:[Simon] quite literally—and in no way do I exaggerate when I say—he stole the song from us ... We go into the studio, and he had quite literally nothing. I mean, he had no ideas, no concepts, and said, "Well, let's just jam." ... Paul goes, "Hey, what's that?" We start playing what we have of it, and it is exactly what you hear on the record." The album sold 13 million copies and we never got paid a penny for it. Not even for the session recording. We bitched about this to the label's president Lenny Waronker nonstop and could not get a straight answer out of him regarding song credit or session payment.

According to Berlin, when he contacted Simon about the lack of credit, Simon responded: "Sue me. See what happens." Simon denied this, and said: "The album came out and we heard nothing. Then six months passed and Graceland had become a hit and the first thing I heard about the problem was when my manager got a lawyer's letter. I was shocked."

Legacy 
New York Times writer Jon Pareles identified Graceland as an album that had popularized African rock in the west, alongside albums such as Peter Gabriel's So (1986) and Talking Heads' Remain in Light (1980). A 2012 documentary film, Under African Skies, was directed by Joe Berlinger for the album's 25th anniversary, and includes archival footage, interviews, discussion of the controversy, and coverage of an anniversary reunion concert.

Advocates for Graceland feel its music transcends the racial and cultural barriers of its production. "Graceland was never just a collection of songs, after all; it was a bridge between cultures, genres and continents, not to mention a global launching pad for the musicians whose popularity had been suppressed under South Africa's white-run apartheid rule", said Andrew Leahey of American Songwriter. Presenting the album in a modern context, Tris McCall of the Star-Ledger writes that "In a sense, Simon was ahead of his time: The curatorial approach he took to assembling full tracks from scraps of songs and pre-existing recordings is closer in execution to that of Kanye West than it is to any of his contemporaries."

The album has influenced musicians including Regina Spektor, Bombay Bicycle Club, Gabby Young, Casiokids, The Very Best, Givers, Lorde, and Vampire Weekend. The latter faced particular criticism that their 2008 debut album was too similar to Graceland, due to its origins in African music. Simon later defended the band, remarking, "In a way, we were on the same pursuit, but I don't think you're lifting from me, and anyway, you're welcome to it, because everybody's lifting all the time. That's the way music grows and is shaped."

Simon recalled his experiences with the record in 2013:

Track listing

Personnel 
Track numbering refers to CD and digital releases of this album.

 Paul Simon – lead vocals, backing vocals (1, 2, 4, 6, 9), acoustic guitar (1, 2, 11), Synclavier (3, 4), guitars (3, 5, 7), six-string bass (6)

Additional musicians
 Rob Mounsey – synthesizers (1, 6), horn arrangements (6) [uncredited on album]
 Forere Motloheloa – accordion (1)
 Jonhjon Mkhalali – accordion (4)
 Alton Rubin, Sr. – accordion (10)
 David Hidalgo – accordion (11), guitars (11), backing vocals (11)
 Adrian Belew – guitar synthesizer (1, 6, 9), guitars (7)
 Ray Phiri – guitars (2, 5, 6, 7, 9)
 Demola Adepoju – pedal steel guitar (2)
 Daniel Xilakazi – lead guitar (4), rhythm guitar (4)
 Sherman Robertson – guitars (10)
 César Rosas– guitars (11), backing vocals (11)
 Bakithi Kumalo – bass (1, 2, 5, 6, 7)
 Lloyd Lelosa – bass (9)
 Alphonso Johnson – bass (10)
 Conrad Lozano – bass (11)
 Vusi Khumalo – drums (1, 2)
 Petrus Manile – drums (4)
 Isaac Mtshali – drums (5, 6, 7, 9)
 Alton Rubin, Jr. – drums (10)
 Louie Pérez – drums (11)
 Steve Gadd – additional drums (11)
 Makhaya Mahlangu – percussion (1, 2)
 Ralph MacDonald – percussion (4, 6, 7, 11)
 Lulu Masilela – tambourine (4)
 Youssou N'Dour – percussion (5)
 Babacar Faye – percussion (5)
 Assane Thiam – percussion (5)
 David Rubin – washboard (10)
 Barney Rachabane – saxophone (4)
 Mike Makhalemele – saxophone (4)
 Teaspoon Ndelu – saxophone (4)
 Alex Foster – alto saxophone (5)
 Lenny Pickett – tenor saxophone (5)
 Ronnie Cuber – baritone saxophone (6), bass saxophone (6)
 Morris Goldberg – penny whistle solo (6), soprano saxophone (9)
 Johnny Hoyt – saxophone (10)
 Steve Berlin – saxophone (11)
 Dave Bargeron – trombone (6)
 Kim Allan Cissel – trombone (6)
 Earl Gardner – trumpet (5)
 Randy Brecker – trumpet (6)
 Jon Faddis – trumpet (6)
 Alan Rubin – trumpet (6)
 Lew Soloff – trumpet (6)
 The Everly Brothers – additional vocals (2)
 The Gaza Sisters – vocals (3)
 Michelle Cobbs – backing vocals (4)
 Diane Garisto – backing vocals (4)
 Ladysmith Black Mambazo – vocals (5, 8)
 Linda Ronstadt – additional vocals (7)
 Joseph Shabalala – vocals (8)

Technical
 Paul Simon – producer, arrangements, liner notes 
 Ray Phiri – co-arrangements 
 Roy Halee – engineer
 Mark Cobrin – assistant engineer (1–7, 9, 11)
 Peter Thwaites – assistant engineer (1–4, 9)
 Steven Strassman – assistant engineer (2, 7, 11)
 Andrew Fraser – assistant engineer (8)
 Greg Calbi – mastering at Sterling Sound (New York City, New York)
 Jeffrey Kent Ayeroff – art direction 
 Jeri McManus – art direction
 Kim Champagne – design 
 Mark Sexton – front cover photography 
 Gary Heery – back cover photography

Graceland: The Remixes
In June 2018, Sony Music and Legacy Records issued Graceland: The Remixes, featuring remixes of Graceland songs by artists including Paul Oakenfold, Groove Armada and Thievery Corporation.

Charts

Weekly charts

Year-end charts

Decade-end charts

Certifications and sales

Notes

References

Citations

Works cited 
 

1986 albums
Albums involved in plagiarism controversies
Albums produced by Paul Simon
Albums produced by Roy Halee
Apartheid in South Africa
Grammy Award for Album of the Year
Grammy Hall of Fame Award recipients
Paul Simon albums
Race-related controversies in music
United States National Recording Registry recordings
Warner Records albums
World music albums by American artists
Worldbeat albums
United States National Recording Registry albums